General elections were held in Malta on Saturday, 3 June 2017  to elect all members of the House of Representatives.. The elections were contested by the Labour Party, led by Prime Minister Joseph Muscat, the Nationalist Party, led by opposition leader Simon Busuttil, and four other parties, making it the elections with most parties participating since 1962.

The Labour Party won a second term in government for the first time since 1976, receiving 55% of the vote, the highest share since 1955. Voter turnout was 92%, down 1pp from 2013.

Background
The previous general elections were held on Saturday, 9 March 2013. The Labour Party, led by Muscat, defeated the incumbent Nationalist Party of Lawrence Gonzi in a landslide victory, taking 39 seats in the House of Representatives, against 30 for the Nationalist Party. However, on 5 February 2015 the Constitutional Court ordered two additional seats to be given to the Nationalist Party, increasing the total number of seats to 71. The Labour Party then lost a seat when Marlene Farrugia resigned from the Labour parliamentary group, to later form the Democratic Party.

Following the defeat, Gonzi stepped down as leader of the Nationalists, with Simon Busuttil taking his place on 13 May.

Muscat was sworn in as the new Prime Minister on 11 March. The cabinet of 15 ministers was the largest cabinet in Maltese history. This record was again surpassed when Muscat announced a cabinet reshuffle following the appearance of Minister Konrad Mizzi's name in the Panama Papers; the new cabinet featured 16 ministers as well as the Prime Minister. Mizzi was included in the new cabinet as Minister within the Office of the Prime Minister. Prior to the 2013 elections, Muscat had pledged that the size of his Cabinet would never exceed the size of the largest Cabinet of the Fenech Adami administrations, the largest of which consisted of 13 ministers.

Further to the outbreak of the Panama Papers, where the already mentioned Mizzi and Keith Schembri, the Chief of Staff within the Office of the Prime Minister were included as owners of a Panama company, together with an unnamed owner of a third company, the Maltese government was receiving copious amounts of pressure by civil society, spearheaded by blogger Daphne Caruana Galizia, but also by the Nationalist Party, especially Leader of the Opposition Simon Busuttil. Nexia BT, a Maltese audit firm, claimed ownership of Egrant.

On 20 April 2017, Caruana Galizia, published a series of articles linking Joseph Muscat, Konrad Mizzi, Brian Tonna (managing partner at Nexia BT, owner of BT International, which is the sole shareholder in the Maltese Mossack Fonseca franchise). Muscat called a press conference stating that he asked for an inquiry into Caruana Galizia's claims, categorically denying any wrongdoing and labelling the allegations as "the biggest lie in Malta's political history". Around two hours later, Pilatus Bank Chairman Ali Sadr Hasheminejad, an Iranian with a St. Kitts and Nevis passport, was spotted exiting the bank with a colleague, each carrying a piece of luggage. Hasheminejad declined to give further information. Police raided Pilatus Bank on 21 April, however this was deemed as being too late by the PN media since that night a "mysterious" ferry flight operated by VistaJet was en route to Baku, Azerbaijan. Further to this, PN leader Busuttil called for Muscat's resignation and announced a national demonstration against corruption, also deeming inappropriate the Police's "inaction" since the Police Commissioner was enjoying dinner in a restaurant. Michael Briguglio, an Alternattiva Demokratika politician, agreed that the Prime Minister should resign and tweeted that he would be joining the protest.

On 1 May 2017 Muscat announced a snap election to take place on 3 June 2017. The announcement was made during a May Day rally organised by the Labour Party in Valletta. The reason cited was to safeguard economic stability from the power hungry.

Electoral system
The Maltese voting system is a variant of proportional representation, achieved through the use of the single transferable vote, with five MPs to be returned from each of thirteen districts. The five seat electoral district system is maintained by the parties represented in the House of Representatives but is not a constitutional requirement. Overall, there are 65 constituency seats, with a variable number of at-large seats (up to four) added in some cases, to ensure that the overall first-preference vote is reflected in the composition of the House of Representatives, that is, that the party with the most votes has a majority of seats.

In the 2017 election, two top-up seats were added, upping the Nationalist seat count by two seats.

Participating parties

The Maltese political landscape is regarded as one of the most pure two-party systems of the 21st century, and has been dominated by moderate centre-left and centre-right groups for decades; no third parties had elected MPs since the 1962 election. Six parties fielded candidates in the 2017 election, the first time since 1962 that Maltese voters had that many parties on the ballot:
The Labour Party (PL) of incumbent Prime Minister Joseph Muscat held a majority in the legislature since the 2013 election, with 38 MPs at dissolution. The Labour Party traditionally pursues social democratic ideals, and is rooted in the mainstream European centre-left.
The Nationalist Party (PN) of opposition leader Simon Busuttil is the major opposition party in parliament, with 29 MPs at dissolution. The party's last prime minister was Lawrence Gonzi, who also served as prime minister from 2004 to 2013. For much of its history, the PN has embraced conservatism and Christian democracy, as well as European integration.
The Democratic Party (PD) which was founded when Labour MP Marlene Farrugia left her party on 4 June 2016. It had 1 MP (Farrugia herself) at dissolution. On 28 April 2017, the PD formed the Forza Nazzjonali coalition with the PN. Under the agreement candidates contested the election as Nationalist candidates, with the additional descriptor "tal-oranġjo", and any elected PD members would have participated in a potential Nationalist-led government.
The Democratic Alternative (AD), led by Carmel Cacopardo, is a contemporary party in Malta. It is, however, not represented in parliament. Established in 1989, the party stresses green politics and sustainable development.
Moviment Patrijotti Maltin (MPM), an offshoot of the anti-immigration group Għaqda Patrijotti Maltin led by Henry Battistino which campaigns against illegal immigration, Malta's participation in the Schengen Area, and Islam in Malta.
Alleanza Bidla (AB), a conservative Christian and Eurosceptic party led by Ivan Grech Mintoff.

Opinion polls

Prior to the announcement of the election, opinion polls showed the Labour Party with a consistent lead over the Nationalist Party of around 5 percentage points. Opinion polls conducted during the campaign continued to show similar results.

Candidates and returned MPs
Below is a list of the candidates who ran in the 2017 general election; they are listed in the order used by the Maltese Electoral Commission. Party leaders are marked with an asterisk, while all candidates that successfully obtained a seat in the election, as reported by the electoral commission, are marked in bold. Individual candidates may contest more than one constituency, meaning the some names appear in multiple cells. It is possible for a candidate to be elected in two districts, in which case they resign from one and that seat is assigned to a person of the same party.

The names of the 65 MPs returned for the districts are in bold in the list above. In addition to these, two Nationalist candidates (Carm Mifsud Bonnici and Frederick Azzopardi) were awarded at-large seats in accordance with the proportional representation system.

Results

The 13 separate district election contests produced 37 Labour MPs and 28 Nationalist MPs.
Two at-large seats were awarded to the Nationalist Party.

Reactions

Once preliminary results were known, Muscat claimed victory and Busuttil conceded defeat. Muscat declared the result to be an endorsement of his government's programme, stating that "It is clear that the people have chosen to stay the course."

Busuttil tendered his resignation as Nationalist Party leader, along with that of the entire administration of the Nationalist Party, following the defeat. The party began the process of selecting a new leader, which was expected to be complete by September. Despite this, leading Nationalist Robert Arrigo wrote an open letter to Busuttil imploring him to rescind his resignation.

The Democratic Party celebrated the election of its leader Marlene Farrugia as their first-ever elected MP as a 'historic result'.

Notes

References

External links
 Electoral Commission

Malta
2017 in Malta
General elections in Malta
June 2017 events in Europe